Diving at the 2014 Asian Games was held in Incheon, South Korea from September 29 to October 3, 2014. Ten competitions were held in both men's and women's disciplines. All competition took place at the Munhak Park Tae-hwan Aquatics Center.

Schedule

Medalists

Men

Women

Medal table

Participating nations
A total of 61 athletes from 10 nations competed in diving at the 2014 Asian Games:

References

External links
 Official website

 
Asia
2014
2014 Asian Games events
2014 Asian Games
International aquatics competitions hosted by South Korea